The California Region of the Mountain Rescue Association (Also called CRMRA) consists of 20 accredited teams throughout California and also includes one team from Nevada.  The California Region is one of the eight regions within the Mountain Rescue Association (MRA) which is a national volunteer organization in the United States dedicated to saving lives through rescue and mountain safety education.

CRMRA accreditation and re-accreditation 

In order for a team to become a member of the CRMRA they must be sponsored by an existing team and complete three separate accreditation tests in the categories of Search and Tracking, Technical Rock, and Snow and Ice. The tests are evaluated by long time members of the MRA from other CRMRA teams and new teams are eventually voted into the CRMRA based on their performance in these three main areas. Typically, new teams join as Associate Members and then go through the accreditation process over the next several years.

Once a team is part of the CRMRA they are expected to re-accredit once a year. Each year the test is hosted by one of the teams in the region and rotates between Search and Tracking, Technical Rock, and Snow and Ice. During the yearly Re-Accreditation testing each team is evaluated by two senior members from other teams in the region and given a score between 0 and 18 points. Teams need a score of at least 12 points to pass; if they receive lower than 12 points they are given the opportunity to do a make up test on a future date.  The subject areas are: Leadership, Operation Plan, Communication, Safety, Medical and Technical.

California Region MRA re-accreditation history 

January 26–27, 1985 - June Mountain Rescue hosts "MRA Ice-Climbing Seminar" 45 people from Inyo County, China Lake Naval Weapons Center, Yosemite National Park, San Diego, Sylmar and Malibu, as well as individuals from the Bridgeport office of the California Highway Patrol and the Marine Mountain Warfare Training Center.

January 28, 1984 - Mammoth Lakes Search and Rescue tests in Ice Rescue to become part of the MRA. Silver Lake, High Sierria, California.

Teams in the CRMRA 
As of April 2016 the following teams are full members of CRMRA

CRMRA business 
The CRMRA holds quarterly regional meetings throughout the state for CRMRA elected officials and representatives from teams in the region.  Elected positions include: 
 Chairman 
 Vice Chairman 
 Secretary
 Treasurer

See also
 Mountain Rescue in the United States

References

External links
 California Region of the Mountain Rescue Association
 Mountain Rescue Association

Mountain rescue